is a city located in Yamagata Prefecture, Japan. , the city had an estimated population of 26,466 in 9940 households, and a population density of 120 people per km².

Geography
Nagai is located in mountainous southern Yamagata Prefecture. The Mogami River passes through eastern portion the city, and the northwest end of the city includes Mount Asahi.

Neighboring municipalities
Yamagata Prefecture
Nan'yō
Shirataka
Iide
Oguni
Kawanishi
Asahi

Climate
Nagai has a Humid continental climate (Köppen climate classification Cfa) with large seasonal temperature differences, with warm to hot (and often humid) summers and cold (sometimes severely cold) winters. Precipitation is significant throughout the year, but is heaviest from August to October.

Demographics
Per Japanese census data, the population of Nagai has declined over the past 70 years.

History
The area of present-day Nagai was part of Dewa Province and was part of the holdings of Yonezawa Domain under the Edo period Tokugawa shogunate. The village of Nagai was created within Nishiokitama District, Yamagata with the establishment of the modern municipalities system on April 1, 1889. Nagai merged with the neighboring villages of Toyoda, Hirano, Nishine and Isazawa on November 15, 1954 to form the city of Nagai.

Government
Nagai has a mayor-council form of government with a directly elected mayor and a unicameral city legislature of 16 members. The city contributes two members to the Yamagata Prefectural Assembly shared with Nishiokitama District.  In terms of national politics, the city is part of Yamagata District 2 of the lower house of the Diet of Japan.

Economy
The economy of Nagai is based on agriculture and light manufacturing of electronic and robotic components and pharmaceuticals.

Education
Nagai has six public elementary schools and two public middle schools operated by the city government and two public high schools operated by the Yamagata Prefectural Board of Education.

Transportation

Railway
 East Japan Railway Company - Yonesaka Line

 Yamagata Railway Company - Flower Nagai Line
  -  -  -  -  -  -

Highways

International relations

Twin towns — Sister cities
 - Bad Säckingen, Waldshut, Baden-Württemberg, Germany, since May 8, 1983
 – Shuangyashan, Heilongjiang, China, since May 21, 1992

Notable people
Hirofumi Watanabe, professional soccer player

References

External links

Official Website 

 
Cities in Yamagata Prefecture